Felicita Kalinšek (born in Kamnik in 1865; died 1937) was a Slovenian nun who became the first cooking teacher at the School of Home Economics in Ljubljana. She is noted for her cookbook which was first published in 1923.

References 

19th-century Roman Catholic nuns
Women cookbook writers
People from Kamnik
1865 births
1937 deaths
20th-century Slovenian women writers
20th-century Slovenian writers
20th-century Roman Catholic nuns